Rotterdamse Elektrische Tram (RET) is the main public transport operator in Rotterdam, Netherlands. It started in 1905 when they took over the city tram lines from RTM (Rotterdamsche Tramweg Maatschappij). It currently operates 64 bus lines, 11 tram lines and five metro/light rail lines in Rotterdam and the surrounding municipalities.

RET used to employ the National Tariff System, like other local transport companies in the Netherlands. On 29 January 2009, metro trips switched to using an OV-chipkaart; bus and tram trips followed on 11 February 2010.

Tram

Tramlines

Bus

Buslines

Metro

Metrolines

External links
   Official website

Tram transport in the Netherlands
Public transport operators
Light rail in the Netherlands
Transport in Rotterdam
Transport in South Holland
Dutch brands